Robert Musso is a New York City-based guitarist, composer, engineer, and producer. He is the founder of the independent record label MuWorks as well as the record label - MussoMusic.com. Over the course of a 40 - year career, Musso has produced, mixed, remixed, played on, written, or contributed to over 2000 records, CDs, movie soundtracks, on every continent in the world except Antarctica.

Biography
After graduating from Rutgers University with two degrees (Economics and Recording Engineering), Musso began obtaining studio work as a musician, engineer and producer. During this period, he worked with a wide variety of artists, including Stevie Wonder, Bob Dylan, Mick Jagger, the Dalai Lama, Miles Davis, Al Green, Bob Marley, Herbie Hancock, Sting, Carlos Santana, Jimi Hendrix, The Seventy Sevens, David Bowie, George Clinton, Dave Matthews, Ornette Coleman, John Zorn, Peter Gabriel, The Ramones, Iggy Pop, Blondie, Whitney Houston, Sly & Robbie, Fine Young Cannibals, Pharoah Sanders, William Burroughs, Julian Schnabel, Bootsy Collins, The Last Poets, Ozzy Osbourne and Steve Vai. In 1981, he began a long and fruitful association with Bill Laswell. These projects included Material's Hallucination Engine, Sly and Robbie's Rhythm Killers (1987), One Down with Whitney Houston, and the multinational Method of Defiance project. He has also recorded with Tom Waits (Raindogs), Ginger Baker (Horses & Trees) and P.M. Dawn (The Bliss Album). His work for Miles Davis, Jimi Hendrix, and Bob Marley were album remixes and done posthumously.

As a musician, Musso studied jazz guitar with Ted Dunbar and played in the Livingston Jazz Ensemble. He has played on recordings by Tom Waits, P.M. Dawn, Ginger Baker, Material, Machine Gun, Lunar Ensemble, etc.

In 1986, Musso founded MuWorks records in order to promote improvised music. Artists who have released CDs through MuWorks include Thomas Chapin, Last Exit, Lunar Bear Ensemble, Musso himself and Machine Gun.

Beginning in 1986, Thomas Chapin and Musso led the downtown improvisational ensemble, Machine Gun. Three of their concerts have been preserved on CD.

He is a member of the Audio Engineering Society (AES), The Society of Motion Picture and Television Engineers (SMPTE), and is a Certified Audio Engineer by the Society of Broadcast Engineers (SBE). He is also a registered NYC 9/11 First Responder.

Discography
Solo work (as Robert Musso)
 Absolute Music (1989)
 Active Resonance (1992)
 Innermedium (1999, DIW Records)
Live at the Bowery Poetry Project
Solo work (as Transonic - these releases appeared on the Fax label and Fax sub-label Ambient World)
 Downstream Illusion (7/94)
 Virtual Current (12/94)
 Future Primitive (10/95)

with Machine Gun
 Machine Gun (1988)
 Open Fire (1989)
 Pass the Ammo (1992)

References

External links
 Robert Musso at Discogs
 [ review of Absolute Music]
 [ review of Active Resonance]
 [ review of Innermedium]

Living people
Year of birth missing (living people)
DIW Records artists
Rutgers University alumni
Guitarists from New York (state)
Machine Gun (band) members